Tango Monologues is the second studio album (and the first solo album) by Argentine pianist Juan María Solare. It was recorded at the Bösendorfer grand piano of the University of Bremen, Germany, and released in January 2010 by the label Janus Music & Sound, LC-24894, catalogue nr. JMS-001). Digital re-release of the album: 25 May 2013. Total length: 79:20

Content / Track Listing 
The album Tango Monologues features 20 tracks, from which 12 were composed by the pianist himself:

Reviews 

Review by Pablo Bardin in Tribuna musical
Review by Ray Picot in ILAMS (Iberian and Latin American Music Society), London 
Review in Rainslore's World, 2013
Review by Dagmar Schnürer, "Offene Tango-Orchester", magazine TangoDanza, Bielefeld, Germany, July 2010)
Review by Norberto Gimelfarb in the magazine Viva la musica (sixième série), mensuel de l’AMR (Association pour l’encouragement de la musique improvisée), Genève (Switzerland), décembre 2011, nº 327. 
Review by Lars Fischer, Wümme Zeitung, Lilienthal (Germany) 6 March 2010
Review by Claudio Ratier in the magazine Cantabile nr. 61 (Buenos Aires, November–December 2011)
Review by Christian Emigholz, "Juan María Solare gibt dem klassischen Tango ein neues Gesicht", Weser Kurier, Bremen, 16 February 2010
Review by Daniel Varacalli, Revista Teatro Colón No. 100, page 128 (Buenos Aires, November 2011)

official information and references 
 Tango Monologues - album by Juan María Solare
 Tango Monologues in AllMusic
 Tango Monologues in musicbrainz
 Juan María Solare in AllMusic

References

Tango albums
Juan María Solare albums
2010 albums
Albums produced by Juan María Solare